Chris Batchelor is a British jazz trumpeter and composer. He gained his first professional experience with Dudu Pukwana's Zila aged 17, at the suggestion of Harry Beckett. He subsequently became a founder member, composer and soloist with Loose Tubes, contributing many pieces to the repertoire of the band from 1984-1990. He was also very active at this time as a member of legendary world music trailblazers 3 Mustaphas 3, as well as enjoying a varied diet of gigs with Chris McGregor's Brotherhood of Breath, Congolese soukous band Taxi Pata Pata and Ashley Slater's Microgroove.

As a sideman, Chris has appeared alongside many international stars, such as Michael Brecker, Sam Rivers, Hermeto Pascoal, John Taylor and the Jazz Passengers with Deborah Harry. He has enjoyed a long term playing partnership with altoist Steve Buckley in their bands Orchestra Rafiki, Buckley /Batchelor Quartet and most recently with their award-winning international collaboration Big Air, featuring New York based Myra Melford and Jim Black.

The music that Buckley and Batchelor wrote for the Jazz on 3 commission that brought Big Air together subsequently won them a BBC Jazz Award for Best New Work in 2001. Their 2009 release entitled Big Air was described by Brian Morton in Jazz Journal as "the best British jazz record for 20 years". In November 2009, Batchelor was selected to receive the prestigious Paul Hamlyn Foundation Award for Composers.

Discography

As leader
1994: Whole & The Half – with Steve Buckley
1999: "Life As We Know it" with Steve Buckley
2009: "Big Air"

As sideman
With Django Bates
Summer Fruits (and Unrest) (JMT, 1993)
Winter Truce (and Homes Blaze) (JMT, 1995)
With Loose Tubes
 Loose Tubes (1985)
 Delightful Precipice (1986)
 Open Letter (1988)
With Billy Jenkins
 Scratches of Spain (1987)

References

www.chris-batchelor.com

British jazz trumpeters
Male trumpeters
Living people
Nucleus (band) members
Alumni of Leeds College of Music
21st-century trumpeters
21st-century British male musicians
British male jazz musicians
Year of birth missing (living people)
Loose Tubes members
Delightful Precipice members